Gert Helbemäe (birth name Gert-Joachim Einborn; 10 November 1913 Tallinn – 15 July 1974 London) was an Estonian writer and journalist. He is known mainly for his historical novels and short stories.

From 1921 to 1933 he studied in Tallinn French Lyceum.

In 1930s he was an executive editor for several newspapers and magazines: Eesti Pildileht, Roheline Post, Film ja Elu.

In 1944, he fled to Lübeck in Germany. In 1947 he moved to London. In London, he issued the newspaper Eesti Hääl, and from 1960 was also its editor. He also belonged to the board of the Estonian Writers' Cooperative.

He is buried at Gunnersbury Cemetery in Kensington.

Works
 1947: short story collection "Vaikija" ('The Silent One')
 1955: novel "Õekesed" ('The Little Sisters')
 1957–1958: novel "Sellest mustast mungast I and II ('About that Black Monk', I and II)
 1960: novel "Ohvrilaev" ('The Ship to Delos')

References

1913 births
1974 deaths
Estonian male short story writers
Estonian male novelists
Estonian journalists
20th-century Estonian writers
Estonian World War II refugees
Estonian emigrants to the United Kingdom
Writers from Tallinn